Church San José of Aibonito, on the town plaza of Aibonito, Puerto Rico, was built over the ten-year period from 1897–1897.  It was listed on the U.S. National Register of Historic Places in 1984.

It is one of five churches designed by State Architect Pedro Cobreros.  It was built during 1887 to 1897, and includes two aisles and a nave.

It is one of 31 churches reviewed for listing on the National Register in 1984.

See also
National Register of Historic Places listings in central Puerto Rico

References

Churches on the National Register of Historic Places in Puerto Rico
Aibonito, Puerto Rico
1897 establishments in Puerto Rico
Spanish Colonial architecture in Puerto Rico
Roman Catholic churches completed in 1897
Roman Catholic churches in Puerto Rico